Sven-Olof Westlund (born 12 February 1932) is a retired Swedish sprinter.

Westlund won the national 200 m title in 1959 and was part of the Swedish 4 × 100 m team that finished sixth at the 1954 European Championships.

References

Swedish male sprinters
1932 births
Living people
20th-century Swedish people